Syrian Education TV (Arabic القناة الفضائية التربوية السورية) launched by the Syrian Ministry of Education on 14 October 2008 on Arabsat and it was later launched in June 2009 to  broadcast from Damascus on Nilesat.

References

External links
Syrian Education TV live stream 

Arabic-language television stations
Television channels in Syria
Television channels and stations established in 2008
2008 establishments in Syria
Mass media in Damascus